Paul Ian Dyson (born 27 December 1959) is an English former professional footballer who played as a central defender for Coventry City, Stoke City, West Bromwich Albion, Darlington and Crewe Alexandra.

Career
Dyson was born in Birmingham and began his career with Coventry City progressing through the youth team at Highfield Road he made his debut on 23 December 1978 at home to Everton in place of the injured Gary Gillespie. He played once more match in the 1978–79 season and was prevented from remaining in the side due to the arrival of Bristol City's Gary Collier and Sunderland's Jim Holton. However the new signings failed to impress and Dyson played against Oldham Athletic in the FA Cup on 5 January 1980 and went on to miss just three matches in the next four years for Coventry and his performances earned him a call up to the England U21s where he won four caps.

After a poor summer of 1983 for Coventry which saw a number of players refuse new contracts in protest at the sacking of Dave Sexton Dyson joined First Division rivals Stoke City. In 1983–84 he played in 44 matches as Stoke avoided relegation by two points but Stoke then suffered an embarrassing relegation in 1984–85, going down with a record low points tally of 17. He made 38 appearances in 1985–86 before he joined West Bromwich Albion in March 1986. He could help the Baggies avoid relegation Second Division and he spent the next two seasons at the Hawthorns and had sport spells with Darlington and Crewe Alexandra before deciding to retire at the age of 30.

He then went on to play non-league football with Telford United and Solihull Borough was manager of Solihull for a time in the late 1990s. He then worked as a prison officer and later ran his own sports shop in the Kings Heath area of Birmingham.

Career statistics
Source:

A.  The "Other" column constitutes appearances and goals in the Football League Trophy, Full Members Cup.

References

External links
 

1959 births
Living people
Footballers from Birmingham, West Midlands
Association football defenders
English footballers
England under-21 international footballers
Coventry City F.C. players
Stoke City F.C. players
West Bromwich Albion F.C. players
Darlington F.C. players
Crewe Alexandra F.C. players
Telford United F.C. players
Solihull Borough F.C. players
English Football League players